Brian John Edward Powell (10 March 1936 – 25 December 2017), known as John Powell, was an English semi-professional footballer who played as a winger in the Football League for York City and in non-League football for White Rose, Cliftonville, Scarborough, Goole Town and Boston United.

References

1936 births
2017 deaths
Footballers from York
English footballers
Association football wingers
York City F.C. players
Scarborough F.C. players
Goole Town F.C. players
Boston United F.C. players
English Football League players